The Golden West Trot is a defunct three-race series in harness racing for Standardbred trotters aged three and older. It was first run in 1946 with a purse of $50,000 which at the time was the richest offered in the sport.  The race final was hosted on an alternating basis, until the final running in 1954, by Santa Anita Park in Arcadia, California, and Hollywood Park Racetrack in Inglewood, California. During the same period, these tracks also offered the corresponding Golden West Pace.

Historical race events
The only multiple winner of the race was 1951 American Harness Horse of the Year and a future U.S. Racing Hall of Fame inductee Pronto Don who won three straight editions of the Golden West Trot between 1951 and 1953.

Records
 Most wins by a driver
 3 – Benny Schue (1951, 1952, 1953)

 Most wins by a trainer
 2 – Benny Schue (1952, 1953)

 Stakes record
 2:30 3/5 – Pronto Don (1951) at 1 1/4 miles
 2:22 4/5 – Scotch Victor (1954) at 1 3/16 miles

Winners of the Golden West Trot

References

Santa Anita Park
Hollywood Park Racetrack
Harness races in the United States
Discontinued harness races
Sports competitions in California
1946 establishments in California
1954 disestablishments in California
Recurring sporting events established in 1946
Recurring sporting events disestablished in 1954